The Amorous Milkman is a 1975 British comedy film directed by Derren Nesbitt and starring Julie Ege, Diana Dors and Brendan Price. The plot is about a young milkman who enjoys a number of adventures with bored women on his round. One version of the poster showed a self-satisfied cat licking its lips above the tagline, "If your pussy could only talk."

Plot 
Randy milkman Davey ends up delivering more than pints of milk to some of the bored housewives on his round. In a short space of time he finds himself engaged to two different women, Janice and Margo, on the receiving end of a bad beating from John, the local gangster, whose girlfriend Diana has been two-timing him with Davey, and finally ending up in court on a rape charge when Gerald, an irate husband, comes home unexpectedly and discovers Davey and his wife Rita in a compromising situation.

Cast
 Julie Ege as Diana
 Diana Dors as Rita
 Brendan Price as Davey
 Alan Lake as Sandy
 Donna Reading as Janice
 Nancie Wait as Margo
 Bill Fraser as Gerald
 Roy Kinnear as Sergeant
 Ray Barrett as John
 Fred Emney as Magistrate
 Patrick Holt as Tom
 Anthony Sharp as Counsel
 Megs Jenkins as Iris
 Arnold Ridley as Cinema Attendant
 Sam Kydd as Wilf
 Janet Webb as Vera
 Marianne Morris as Dora (uncredited)
 Hugo Keith-Johnston as Hippy in the Nightclub (uncredited)

Production
It was one of a number of sex comedies featuring Diana Dors.

Critical reception
David Parkinson, the Radio Times reviewer, wrote: "Brendan Price does his best to rattle his pintas with panache. The most significant thing about this bawdy trash is what it says about the state of the British film industry at the time – it's sad that this was the only worthwhile work Diana Dors, Roy Kinnear and other talented actors could find"; while Sky Movies wrote, "much in the vulgar mode of dozens of 'Confessions', 'Adventures' and 'Up' sex romps of the Seventies, this one-man project (actor Derren Nesbitt wrote, produced and directed it) is a touch above that level, if only because its girls are at least sexy and its veteran cast is full of names who have seen better films and better days."

References

External links

1975 films
1970s English-language films
Films directed by Derren Nesbitt
Fictional milkmen
British sex comedy films
1970s sex comedy films
1975 comedy films
1970s British films